Tmesisternus trilineatus is a species of beetle in the family Cerambycidae. It was described by Stephan von Breuning in 1966.

References

trilineatus
Beetles described in 1966